Botum Sakor is a district (srok) of Koh Kong Province, in south-western Cambodia. The entire district is to be protected as a national park since 1993.

Administration

See also
 Botum Sakor National Park

Notes

Districts of Koh Kong province